Fiat 500e is the name of a battery electric automobile made by Italian car manufacturer Fiat from 2013-2019. It was an electric conversion of the internal combustion Fiat 500 (2007–2019), and was sold in the US states of California and Oregon as a "compliance car" to earn clean energy credits for Fiat Chrysler Automobiles.

The Fiat New 500 (2020), a dedicated battery electric vehicle model sold in Europe, is often referred to colloquially as the 500e, although Fiat does not refer to it as such in any official marketing materials.

500e
Production electric cars
Fiat electric vehicles